Vincas Mickevičius (pl. Wincenty Mickiewicz, October 19, 1882 – July 17, 1954), better known by his pen name Vincas Krėvė-Mickevičius, was a Lithuanian writer, poet, novelist, playwright and philologist. He is also known as Vincas Krėvė, the shortened name he used in the United States.

Biography
Vincas Mickevičius was born to a family of peasant farmers on October 19, 1882, in the village of Subartonys in Dzūkija ethnographic region of Lithuania.  His family was called Krėvė by the local villagers, the name that he later used for his pen name.  The customs and traditions of his native district were a constant source of the inspiration for his literary work.

In 1898, he became a student for the Roman Catholic priesthood at the Vilnius Seminary, but in 1900 he was expelled from the seminary. In 1904, he enrolled the University of Kyiv.  However, a year later, the university was temporarily closed due to the revolutionary conditions in the Russian Empire, and Krėvė-Mickevičius, unwilling to interrupt his studies, entered the University of Lviv, in Galicia, which was at the time part of the Austrian Empire, and in 1908, he received his doctorate in philology.  That same year, the University of Kyiv awarded him a gold medal for his thesis on the original home of the Indo-Europeans.  In 1913, the University of Kyiv awarded him the degree of Master of Comparative Linguistics for his dissertation on the origin of the names Buddha and Pratjekabuddha.

In 1909, Krėvė-Mickevičius became a high school teacher in the city of Baku, Azerbaijan.  Three years later he assisted in founding the People's University of Baku, and delivered lectures there.

Lithuania achieved independence in 1918, and a year later, Krėvė-Mickevičius became Lithuanian Consul in Azerbaijan.  In 1920, he returned to Lithuania, and settled in Kaunas, which at the time was the temporary capital.

When the University of Lithuania was founded in 1922, Vincas Krėvė-Mickevičius became professor of Slavic Languages and Literatures, and remained there as part of the faculty for the following two decades.

His first attempts on writing came at the age fifteen, at first using Russian and Polish languages; however, after 1902, he wrote in Lithuanian.  The first volume of his collected works was published in 1921, at which time he was already a well-known and respected figure, serving as editor of several academic and literary periodicals.

On 24 June 1940, he was appointed as Prime Minister of Lithuania by acting President Justas Paleckis.  He headed the "People's Government of Lithuania", which was formed essentially as a rubber stamp for the Soviet takeover of Lithuania. On July 1, 1940 he, together with some other communists, visited Vyacheslav Molotov (Minister of Foreign Affairs of the USSR) and asked for full annexation of Lithuania into the USSR (this visit was later used as the pretext for that de jure annexation, although occupation and the de facto annexation happened before that). On returning, he offered his resignation, which was not accepted at the time.

After the start of the Nazi occupation of Lithuania in 1941, and the closing of higher educational institutions in 1943, Krėvė-Mickevičius went into hiding.  Soviet forces reoccupied Lithuania in 1944, at which point he fled the country and settled in a displaced persons camp at Glasenbach, near Salzburg, Austria. There, he taught at the local camp's high school.  In 1947, the University of Pennsylvania extended an invitation to join its faculty. There, he served as an Assistant Professor of Slavic Languages and Literatures until 1953, when he retired.  On July 17, 1954, Vincas Krėvė-Mickevičius died in Broomall, Pennsylvania, United States.

He was considered as a candidate for the Nobel Prize in Literature.

Literature
The literary production of Vincas Krėvė-Mickevičius is wide and varied. It included historical dramas, collections of folklore, short stories and sketches of village life, novels on contemporary problems, and tales based on oriental themes. At his death he was engaged on a major work entitled Sons of Heaven and Earth, which defies classification.  It is written partly as drama and partly as a narration; its subjects are biblical with the action taking place in Palestine at the beginning of the Christian era.  His work filled with a romantic impulse, drawing attention to rural life and oriental themes, is balanced with realistic narration and description.  His writing is characterized by an unusually large vocabulary with remarkable purity. Some scholars sustain that Lithuanian language acquired a range of expression through his works only rivaled by that of Ancient Greece.

Works
Šarūnas, Dainavos kunigaikštis (Šarūnas, Duke of Dainava), 1911
Dainavos šalies senų žmonių padavimai (Old people's myths from the land of Dainava), 1912
Žentas (Son-in-law), 1922
'Šiaudinėj pastogėj (Under the thatched roof), 1922
Skirgaila (Skirgaila), 1922
Dainavos krašto liaudies dainos (Folk Songs of Dainava Region), 1924
Likimo keliais (Along the Paths of Destiny), 1926-1929
Rytų pasakos (Tales of the Orient), 1930
Sparnuočiai liaudies padavimuose (Winged creatures in the folklore myths), 1933
Karaliaus Mindaugo mirtis (The death of King Mindaugas), 1935
Patarlės ir priežodžiai, 1934–37
Raganius (He-witch), 1939
Miglose (In the mists), 1940
Dangaus ir žemės sūnūs (Sons of Heaven and Earth), 1949

Legacy
In 1997, a museum to Krėvė-Mickevičius was opened in his last residence before emigration in Vilnius, Lithuania. A road in the Dainava district of Kaunas, Lithuania is also named after him.

References

External links
 About Krėvė-Mickevičius in Classical Lithuanian Literature anthology. Includes a collection of texts.

1882 births
1954 deaths
People from Varėna District Municipality
People from Troksky Uyezd
Ambassadors of Lithuania to Azerbaijan
Lithuanian communists
Prime Ministers of Lithuania
First convocation members of the Supreme Soviet of the Soviet Union
Lithuanian dramatists and playwrights
Lithuanian male writers
Lithuanian novelists
Lithuanian short story writers
Lithuanian-language writers
Lithuanian writers in Polish
20th-century dramatists and playwrights
20th-century novelists
20th-century short story writers
University of Lviv alumni
Taras Shevchenko National University of Kyiv alumni
University of Pennsylvania faculty